Uprising FC is an anguillian football club based in The Valley which plays in the AFA Senior League, the top tier of anguillian football.

The club was founded in the season 2015–16 and have been an official member of the AFA since 2021.

In 2022, the club hired Englishman Gareth Thomas as their media officer.

Domestic history
Key

Honours
AFL Development League: 1
 2020

References

External links 
 

AFA Senior Male League clubs
Uprising FC
Association football clubs established in 2017
The Valley, Anguilla